Brennan Peter Dickenson (born 26 February 1993) is an English professional footballer who plays as a midfielder for League Two club Carlisle United.

Dickenson's career began at Southampton before moving on to Conference South side Dorchester Town. He earned a move to Championship side Brighton & Hove Albion in 2012. He failed to break into the Brighton first team, instead heading out on loan to Chesterfield, AFC Wimbledon and Northampton Town. He was released in 2014, joining League One side Gillingham. He joined Colchester United after two seasons with the Kent club.

Career

Brighton & Hove Albion
Born in Ferndown, former Southampton trainee Dickenson signed for Championship club Brighton & Hove Albion in January 2012 for an undisclosed fee from Dorchester Town. He had scored five goals in 22 Conference South games during the first half of the 2011–12 season. He joined League Two side Chesterfield on a one-month loan deal on 8 November 2012. He scored on his professional debut on 10 November after replacing Mark Randall 61-minutes into a 3–2 defeat by Bristol Rovers. He made five starts and six substitute appearances during his time with the Spireites.

AFC Wimbledon signed Dickenson on loan for one-month in February 2013. He made his debut on 23 February in Wimbledon's 1–0 win at Dagenham & Redbridge, before scoring in consecutive games, first against Cheltenham Town in a 2–1 defeat, and then a week later in a 3–2 home win over York City. In all, Dickenson made seven appearances for the Dons, before agreeing a one-year contract extension with Brighton at the end of the season.

Still without a first-team appearance for Brighton, Dickenson was allowed to leave on loan for League Two once again, this time for Northampton Town until the end of the 2013–14 season on 8 February 2014. He made his debut the same day as Northampton fell to a 2–0 home defeat by Plymouth Argyle. He scored one goal for the club, in a 2–0 win against Hartlepool United on 22 February, and made 13 league appearances.

In May 2014, Dickenson had a contract clause invoked extending his contract by one season.

Gillingham
Gillingham paid an undisclosed fee to bring Dickenson to the League One club on a two-year contract on 30 June 2014, just weeks after extending his Brighton contract. He made his debut on 9 August 2014 as a 77th-minute substitute for Jake Hessenthaler in Gillingham's 4–2 defeat to Milton Keynes Dons. He scored in his second game in his first start for the club with a first-half goal against Yeovil Town in the League Cup. He was withdrawn at half-time after picking up a slight injury. He made 42 appearances during the season, scoring three goals.

Bradley Garmston ousted Dickenson from the left-back position which he had become accustomed to playing for Gillingham by November 2015, with manager Justin Edinburgh saying that "choosing between them is probably the most difficult decision." Dickenson had made 18 appearances from August through early November, but found his opportunities limited until March 2016, when a return to first-team action eventually yielded 36 appearances in total. Dickenson was released by Gillingham in May 2016.

Colchester United
After being released by Gillingham, Dickenson joined League Two side Colchester United on a two-year contract. He made his debut for Colchester on 9 August 2016 in their 4–0 EFL Cup defeat to his former club Brighton, before scoring his first goal on his league debut four days later in Colchester's 2–0 win at home to Cambridge United. His performance was recognised by the English Football League when he was named in the 'Team of the Week' for all three divisions. He scored a brace in his next match on 16 August as he helped his side to a 3–2 win over Grimsby Town at the Colchester Community Stadium. As a result of his performance, he was named in the EFL 'Team of the Week' for the second week in succession. He was also nominated for the League Two 'Player of the Month' award after three goals and an assist in his four league appearances in August.

After a goal in each of Colchester's wins against Stevenage and Cheltenham Town either side of New Year, Dickenson was named in the EFL 'Team of New Year' on 3 January 2017. Having firmly established himself as a regular starter as a left wing-back in the Colchester first-team, Dickenson said that "the spell I'm having at the moment is probably the best in my career. I've had a few good seasons but this is probably the best." Dickenson then sustained cruciate ligament damage in April 2017 which would rule him out of action for up to nine months. In his first season with the club, after scoring 12 goals in 39 appearances, he was named Player of the Year alongside the Players' Player of the Year award.

Dickenson revealed in July 2017 that his injury sustained in April would likely keep him out of first-team action until February 2018. He made his first appearance of the 2017–18 season on 13 February 2018, replacing Kane Vincent-Young during Colchester's 2–1 win against Coventry City. At the end of the season, Dickenson took up the option on his contract to remain with Colchester for a further year until at least summer 2019. Dickenson scored his first goals since April 2017 when he scored a brace against Crewe Alexandra in a 6–0 win on 21 August 2018.

Milton Keynes Dons
Dickenson turned down a new contract offer from Colchester, and on 30 May 2019 joined newly-promoted League One club Milton Keynes Dons on a free transfer effective from 1 July 2019. He scored his first goal for MK Dons when he scored in an EFL Trophy tie against Wycombe Wanderers on 12 November 2019.

Exeter City
On 17 January 2020, following the mutual termination of his contract with MK Dons, Dickenson joined League Two club Exeter City on a short-term deal until the end of the season in response to Jack Sparkes sustaining a season-ending knee injury against Newport County on Boxing Day 2019 and other left sided players also being injured. He made his league debut in a 1–0 away win against Grimsby Town at Blundell Park. He scored his first goal for the club in a 5–1 win over Oldham Athletic, scoring directly from a 35-yard free kick. Dickenson was released by Exeter at the end of his contract in July 2020.

Carlisle United
Dickenson joined Carlisle United on a free transfer on 13 August 2020. Dickenson signed a new one-year contract in May 2022.

Style of play
Chesterfield manager Paul Cook described Dickenson as "a very energetic, left-sided midfielder or left-sided striker who will bring a lot of balance to the team and a lot of energy going forward". He played at left-back for Gillingham, keeping regular left-back Bradley Garmston out of the first-team.

Career statistics

Honours
Colchester United Player of the Year: 2016–17
Colchester United Players' Player of the Year: 2016–17

References

External links

1993 births
Living people
People from Ferndown
Footballers from Dorset
English footballers
Association football midfielders
Southampton F.C. players
Dorchester Town F.C. players
Brighton & Hove Albion F.C. players
Chesterfield F.C. players
AFC Wimbledon players
Northampton Town F.C. players
Gillingham F.C. players
Colchester United F.C. players
Milton Keynes Dons F.C. players
Exeter City F.C. players
Carlisle United F.C. players
National League (English football) players
English Football League players